Leonardo Illut (born 21 September 1956) is a Filipino long-distance runner. He competed in the marathon at the 1984 Summer Olympics. Illut is a native of Cebu.

References

1956 births
Sportspeople from Cebu
Living people
Athletes (track and field) at the 1984 Summer Olympics
Filipino male long-distance runners
Filipino male marathon runners
Olympic track and field athletes of the Philippines
Place of birth missing (living people)
Southeast Asian Games medalists in athletics
Southeast Asian Games gold medalists for the Philippines
Competitors at the 1983 Southeast Asian Games